The 2010 European Junior Judo Championships is an edition of the European Junior Judo Championships, organised by the European Judo Union.It was held in Samokov, Bulgaria from 17 to 19 September 2010.

Medal summary

Medal table

Men's events

Women's events

Source Results

References

External links
 

 U21
European Junior Judo Championships
European Championships, U21
Judo competitions in Bulgaria
Judo
Judo, World Championships U21